Demonware, Inc. is an Irish software development company and a subsidiary of Activision, a video game division of Activision Blizzard. Demonware's products enable games publishers to outsource their networking requirements, allowing them to concentrate on playability. The organisation has its headquarters in Dublin, Ireland; and offices in Vancouver, Canada; and Shanghai, China.

History 
Demonware was founded in 2003 by Dylan Collins and Sean Blanchfield. In May 2007, the organisation was purchased by Activision. During the acquisition, Activision offered long-term contracts to the management team and employees of Demonware.

Mike Griffith, CEO of Activision, offered the following statement following the corporate acquisition:
"The acquisition of Demonware will enable us to eliminate many of the challenges associated with online multiplayer game development, reducing development time and risk, and allowing us to deliver consistent, high-quality online gaming experiences. In addition to increasing our talent pool of highly skilled engineers, Demonware's suite of technologies combined with Activision's own library of tools and technologies will enable us to easily share online development capabilities on multiple platforms across our development studios".

Products 
Primary products developed by Demonware include the "Demonware State Engine" and "Matchmaking+". The State Engine is a high-performance state synchronization C++ programming framework that eliminates the need to reinvent netcode in multiplayer games. Matchmaking+ provides services for multiplayer games such as matchmaking, user profiling, and gaming statistics. Demonware's main product, which is used for multiplayer in the Call of Duty franchise (among other games) is programmed in Erlang and Python.

References

External links 
 

Activision
Software companies of Ireland
Video game development companies
Matchmaking software companies
Video game companies of Ireland
Companies based in Dublin (city)
Software companies established in 2003
Video game companies established in 2003
Irish companies established in 2003
Irish subsidiaries of foreign companies
2007 mergers and acquisitions